Kagetora is a Japanese manga series written and illustrated by Akira Segami. It has been licensed in North America by Del Rey and consists of 11 volumes.

Plot

The story is about a male ninja named Kagetora, whose job is to teach the arts of self-defense and combat to the female heir of a renowned family of skilled martial artists, Yuki. Kagetora falls in love with her, but since a ninja is forbidden to fall in love with their lord (or in this case, lady), he struggles to hold back his feelings. The story deals with Kagetora struggling with his sense of duty and his love for Yuki. Yuki also develops feelings for him later on. However, since it is forbidden for their love to be, how will they react to this? Will Kagetora be able to make it happen?

Characters
Kagetora Kazama
Kagetora is a young ninja whose job is to protect Yuki, with whom he is falling in love. Although at first he tries to deny his feelings, he soon comes to realize his true love for Yuki. He has a pet monkey and he has two older brothers who often pick on him. He was slightly pampered by his mother when he was younger, but she also made him stronger. He also is seen to often have low self-control.
Yuki Toudou
Yuki is the heir to the Tōdō family and must learn how to be skilled in self-defense and combat. She gradually develops feelings for Kagetora, which she subtly shows to him throughout the series. She is slightly short, and is polite and charming, although a bit clumsy. During chapter 17 and 27 in volume 4, it is shown that she has better martial abilities when she is drunk, Kagetora thinks so too.
Akino Kiritani
Kiritani is Yuki's previous mentor, and she constantly competes with Kagetora. She is skilled in combat and is very strong physically. She is training under Saya Toudou, Yuki's mother. She is very protective of Yuki, like her younger sister. In the beginning, she develops a strong disapproval of Kagetora being her . Later on, she starts seeing Kujou, Kagetora's disciple.
Sakuya
Sakuya is Kagetora's childhood friend and fellow ninja. She is skilled in several ninjitsu arts, and vies for Kagetora's affection. She had a crush on him ever since she was little, and is very persistent. Yuki and she have a sisterly relationship that Kagetora does not understand.
Issei Kujou 
Kagetora's strong-willed disciple. He is often mistaken to be strong and intimidates many with his size. But Kujou is really very weak and lacks martial arts skill. He initially has a crush on Yuki but then develops stronger feelings for Aki and they start seeing each other later on in the series.
Nao Takatou
Nao attends the same high school as Yuki and Kagetora and is the captain of the archery club. When she enlists Kagetora to fill in for an upcoming archery match, the time she spends training with him causes her to develop feelings for him.
Kosuke
The cute pet ninja monkey of Kagetora. Chapter 0.5 (in Vol. 10) it shows how the two met. Kagetora was in need of a ninja pet. Kosuke and Kagetora connected because, tragically, Kosuke had lost his mother too, and Kagetora came to understand the monkey. They became quick friends and Kosuke agreed to become Kagetora's ninja monkey. Kosuke is able to communicate with his master via pulling out signposts stating his written dialogue for him read and respond to his pet's thoughts and opinions.
Nachi
Another pet in this series, it is the wolf of Shiroumaru, Kagetora's oldest brother. Shiroumaru often forgets about Nachi at Kagetora's at Yuki's house. Nachi is a pup of its mother Shigure, and father Hayate.
Kagura
An eagle that belongs to Taka, Kagetora's 2nd oldest brother.
Saya Toudou
Yuki's mother. She is very strong and skilled in martial arts. She is a teacher for Aki when it comes to Kendo. She is very wise and easygoing.
Tomoe Toudou
Assistant instructor of the Toudou style jujitsu and Yuki's cousin. She is three years older than Yuki, and is also a skilled martial artist as seen when she sparred with Kagetora.
Kureha Kazama
The mother of Kagetora, Shiromaru and Taka. She is mentioned in volume 4 in the episode: The Reason for Smiling. She is also the wife of Tenshuu, and she was a ninja from Hoorai but she could not do her duties because she was physically weak and died while Kagetora was young.
Tenshu Kazama
Kagetora, Taka, and Shiromaru's father. He is skilled and very strict. Often on missions so he hasn't seen Kagetora for some years. Until volume 10 when he meets Yuki, after a long time.
Taka Kazama
The second eldest Kazama brother. He often teases Kagetora. Taka although has very polite manners to others. He is responsible for Kagetora's fear of ghosts and such. Kagetora often shows a fear of Taka because Taka is most strict on him. He has a pet eagle Kagura, and resembles Kureha Kazama, their mother.
Shiroumaru Kazama
The eldest Kazama brother. He and Kagetora have a very close brotherly relationship. Shiroumaru gets a lot of respect out of Kagetora though. He is most daring and knows Taka well. He resembles their father.
Natsume
She is a distant relative of Kagetora.
Kaya
A kunoichi from Hoorai who claims to be the new "" to Yuki. She is very skilled but lacks the knowledge of the karate kata, judo.
Satsuki Reizenn
She transfers to Kagetora's school in chapter twelve. She fell in love with Kagetora at first sight. Very rich, Transferring from the rich-girls school Fuyoh Girls Academy. Willing to use any means necessary to make Kagetora fall in love with her. A stereotypical princess type, pompous, and a stalker who enjoys hunting Kagetora.
Keith Wayland
 A young, handsome foreigner enamoured with samurai. He fights with Kagetora for the honour of being Yuki's bodyguard, and to become a student of the dojo. He ends up being accepted, but loses. He leaves to fight other martial artists and become stronger.
Takemi Toudou
 Yuki's dad and Saya's spouse. He is an archaeologist that travels the world and is therefore unable to be home to help raise Yuki. He brings home his discoveries to show his daughter, but, unfortunately for him, Yuki hates insects.

Chapter list

Volume 1: Mission Impossible
Chapter 1: Inappropriate Instructor 
Chapter 2: Enemies in Love 
Chapter 3: Summertime Attraction 
Chapter 4: Peach-Colored Hime 
Chapter 5: A Wolf is Coming

Volume 2: A Ninja in Love
Chapter 6: There's No Such Thing as Ghosts 
Chapter 7: I'm Not a Kid Anymore 
Chapter 8: Christmas Virgin 
Chapter 9: A Secret Just Between Us 
Chapter 10: Meanie

Volume 3: Forbidden Love
Chapter 11: Useless 
Chapter 12: Target: Kagetora 
Chapter 13: Lady Tutors 
Chapter 14: The Great Escape 
Chapter 15: Dangerous Sumival

Volume 4: Family Affairs
Chapter 16: Swimsuit Competition 
Chapter 17: Scary Person 
Chapter 18: Weak Kagetora 
Chapter 19: Reason for Smiling 
Chapter 20: New Year's Wish

Volume 5: Sacred Duty
Chapter 21: Rival Wolf 
Chapter 22: Cool Guy 
Chapter 23: From Kyoto with Love 
Chapter 24: Butterfly Memories 
Chapter 25: The Person I Love the Most

Volume 6: A Love that Cannot Be
Chapter 26: Kagetora and Aki on a Date? 
Chapter 27: How to Spend a Hot Summer Day 
Chapter 28: Rainy Kamakura 
Chapter 29: Kamakura After the Rain 
Chapter 30: Prelude to a Love Triangle

Volume 7:Three's a Crowd
Chapter 31: A Secret Night
Chapter 32: Restless Yuki
Chapter 33: Confession
Chapter 34: A Face Yuki Doesn't Know
side story: Kagetora Edo Version

Volume 8: Brotherly Love?
Chapter 35: Yuki vs. Taka
Chapter 36: Tiger and Hawk
Chapter 37: The Secret of Yuki's Body
Special Chapter 1: Winter Training Is a Dangerous Thing
Special Chapter 2: Yuki on a Date
Special Chapter 3: Beyond the Hot Spring's Steam
Special Chapter 4: Sweet Talk

Volume 9: Three's Not the Charm!
Chapter 38: Aim for the Ninja!
Chapter 39: Want to Protect
Chapter 40: Secret Crush
Chapter 41: Stolen Love
Chapter 42: A Fist and Tears

Volume 10: Love, Ninja Style!
Chapter 43: Report to Mother
Chapter 44: I Love You!
Chapter 45: First Date
Chapter 46: Another Person
Chapter 47: A Good ""
Chapter 0.5: Meeting

Volume 11: Over Too Soon?
Chapter 48: One Night Only 
Chapter 49: This is an Order 
Chapter 50: Together Forever 
Chapter 0: Kagetora Beta Version

Further reading

External links
 
Kagetora at Del Rey Manga

Del Rey Manga
Kodansha manga
Manga series
Ninja in anime and manga
Shōnen manga